Bizarre Happenings Eyewitnessed over Two Decades (T: 二十年目睹之怪現狀, S: 二十年目睹之怪现状, P: Èrshí Nián Mùdǔzhī Guài Xiànzhuàng, W: Erh-shih nien mu-tu-chih kuai hsien-chuang, also translated as: "Strange Events Witnessed in the Past Twenty Years", "The Strange State of the World Witnessed Over 20 Years", "Reports on Strange Things for the Past Twenty Years", and "Wu Jianren's Strange Events Eyewitnessed over the Last Two Decades") is a novel by Wu Jianren (also known as Wu Wo-yao). The novel was serialized in Xin Xiaoshuo (T: 新小說, S: 新小说, P: Xīn Xiǎoshuō; W: Hsin Hsiao-shuo; "New Fiction"), a magazine by Liang Qichao. In 1909 the novel was completed and published in book form.

The essay "Typology of Plot Structures in Late Qing Novels" by Milena Doleželová-Velingerová, published in the book The Chinese Novel at the Turn of the Century, discusses the novel's plot structure. The novel is known for its use of anecdotes.

The Chinese University Press published an abridged English translation, titled "Bizarre Happenings Eyewitnessed over Two Decades", in 1975.

References
 Des Forges, Alexander. "Anxiety, brand names, and wild chickens." In: Rojas, Carlos and Eileen Chow (editors). Rethinking Chinese Popular Culture: Cannibalizations of the Canon. Routledge, December 8, 2008. , 9780203886649.
 Idema, W. L. "The Chinese Novel at the Turn of the Century" (book review). T'oung Pao, ISSN 0082-5433, January 1982, Volume 68, Issue 4/5, pp. 352 – 355
 Wu, Jianren. "二十年目睹之怪现状: Bizarre Happenings Eyewitnessed over Two Decades." Chinese University Press, January 1, 1975. , 9780870751257.

Notes

1909 novels
20th-century Chinese novels
Novels first published in serial form
Novels set in Shanghai
Novels set in Nanjing
Novels by Wu Jianren